Ben Hawes Golf Course and Park (formerly Ben Hawes State Park) is a park located just outside Owensboro, Kentucky, in Daviess County. The park encompasses , and was named after the former Mayor of Owensboro, Benjamin W. Hawes. It was acquired by the City of Owensboro in 1962. The Park opened Memorial Day in 1964. The City of Owensboro operated the golf course and park until 1980 when the property was sold to the Commonwealth of Kentucky to be operated as a state park. In 2010, the City reacquired the property.

Attractions
The park offers playground equipment, a basketball court, and a baseball field, with the highlight being a 27-hole golf course. There is also a one-mile (1.6 km) hiking trail.

References

External links
 Ben Hawes Park, owensboroparks.org

Buildings and structures in Owensboro, Kentucky
Sports venues in Kentucky  
Parks in Kentucky
Geography of Daviess County, Kentucky
Tourist attractions in Daviess County, Kentucky